Lasswade Rugby Football Club is a rugby union club based in Bonnyrigg, Midlothian, Scotland.

History 

In 2003 the club sold one of its three pitches to the Local Authority, Midlothian, to fund the improvement of the existing facilities. The money has been ploughed into development with two international size floodlit pitches complemented by a 350-seater grandstand. The new facilities have been used by South Africa, France, New Zealand, Edinburgh Rugby, the Scotland 7s squad and the Scottish Women's Rugby Squad as a training ground. It has also been host to several champagne ties including Scotland under-19s v Italy under19s and a number of Scotland Women's Six Nations matches.

After several consecutive seasons earning promotion, Lasswade 1st XV competed the 2010–11 season in the Scottish National League Division One and were promoted to the Scottish Premiership Division 3 for the 2011–12 season.

Notable former players include the ex-Scotland national rugby union team and British and Irish Lions prop forward Peter Wright.

Lasswade won the final of the SHE National Shield which was held at Murrayfield on Saturday 24 April 2010, beating Greenock Wanderers 17–7. In the same season they also won promotion to National League One (fourth tier) after finishing runners-up in League Two.

In season 2010–11 Lasswade won promotion to Premiership Division Three, the highest league position in their history, by winning National League 1. The club also retained the Shield beating Hawick YM in the final 22–17.

Following more league reconstruction by the SRU, in season 2012–13 Lasswade played in Championship League B. This is essentially the East league of the third tier of domestic rugby. Following further league reconstruction, Lasswade found themselves competing in the National League 3 in season 2014–15.

In March 2015, Lasswade won the National League Division Three title but were relegated following just one season in the third tier. However, after finishing runners-up they immediately bounced back up to National League Division Two in 2017.

Lasswade Sevens

The club run the Lasswade Sevens tournament.

Honours 

 Lasswade Sevens
 Champions (1): 2014
 Scottish National League Division Three
 Champions (3): 2010–11, 2014–15, 2021–22
 Runners-Up (1): 2016-17
 Scottish League Championship, sixth-tier
 Champions (1): 2008-09
 Scottish Rugby Shield
 Champions: (2) 2009–10, 2010–11
 East Regional League Division One
 Champions: (1) 2007
Walkerburn Sevens
 Champions (1): 2012

Notable players
 Peter Wright

References

External links 
 

Scottish rugby union teams
Rugby union in Midlothian
Bonnyrigg and Lasswade